Strong Heart is a South Korean talk show or talk battle broadcast by SBS. It aired on Tuesdays from 11:50 to Wednesdays 00:30. It was hosted by Kang Ho-dong and Lee Seung-gi, and later by Lee Dong-wook and Shin Dong-yup with Boom, Super Junior's Leeteuk, Shindong and Eunhyuk as hosts of a special segment and regular guests along with Kim Hyo-jin, Jung Ju-ri and Yang Se-hyung, who are known as six-fixed guests. The program relaunched as a second season with Shin Dong-yup and new hosts, actress, Kim Hee-sun, and singer, Yoon Jong-shin, in February 2013.

History 
The show premiered on 6 October 2009 with Kang Ho-dong and Lee Seung-gi as MCs. In September 2011, Kang withdrew from the show following his temporary retirement from the entertainment industry due to controversy regarding his non-payment of taxes. After hosting solo since Kang's departure, Lee announced in March 2012 that he was leaving the show. He recorded his last episode on March 15, which was broadcast on April 3. Actor Lee Dong-wook and Shin Dong-yup took over as MCs, with their first episode broadcast on April 10, 2012.

In December 2012, it was announced that the show's director, Park Sang-hyuk, left the show for an overseas sabbatical. The show's director was replaced by Shin Hyo-jung with a format changed. The last episode for season one was recorded on 17 January 2013, marking this as MC Lee Dong-wook's last appearance. It was announced on 15 January 2013 that the program will be relaunched as season two with a new format. Shin Dong-yup will remain as host, along with Kim Hee-sun and Yoon Jong-shin, being the first time as main MC for a variety show for Kim. The show is titled Hwasin - Controller of the Heart ("Hwashin" meaning God of Tuesday and God of Talk), with a scaled-down guest panel of four to five guests per episode; to air in mid-February 2013. The new season is billed as "an honest talk show based on topics based on the opinions of viewers".

Format 
About twenty guest stars tell emotional (strong) stories to make people cry or laugh. The best storyteller wins the show. Strong Heart gives viewers and fans a chance to look into the lives of stars by listening to their stories. Many stars come on the show and share stories about their hardships in debuting, strange experiences or some other funny situations that have occurred in their lives. Celebrities have also used their time on the show to try to clear up rumors. From time to time there are also less famous stars invited so that they can have a chance to share their stories. This is important as most of the time when these stories are told on Strong Heart, it is the first time they have ever been told.

Cast 
 Main MC
Kang Ho-dong (2009–2011)
Lee Seung-gi (2009–2012)
Lee Dong-wook (2012–2013)
Shin Dong-yup (2012-2013)
 Academy
Boom
Leeteuk (2009-2012)
Shindong (2009-2012)
Eunhyuk (2009-2013)

Winners 

1st Strong Heart - Oh Young-shil (Episode 1)
2nd Strong Heart - Lee Eui-jung (Episode 2)
3rd Strong Heart - Im Chang-jung (Episode 3)
4th Strong Heart - Hong Seok-cheon (Episode 4 and 5)
5th Strong Heart - Seo In-guk (Episode 6)
6th Strong Heart - Leeteuk of Super Junior, (Episode 7 and 8)
7th Strong Heart - Jo Hye-ryun (Episode 9)
8th Strong Heart - Jung Chan-woo (broadcasts in two episodes, episode 10 until first half of episode 11)
9th Strong Heart - Kim Jang-hoon, Christmas special, broadcasts in two episodes which 2nd half of episode 11 and continue until episode 12
10th Strong Heart - Bada, (Episode 13 and 14)
11th Strong Heart - Bbaek Ga of Koyote, special appointed since the story about him struggling with his brain tumor (Episode 15 and 16)
12th Strong Heart - Kim Gi-wook (broadcasts in two episodes, episode 17 until first half of episode 18)
13th Strong Heart - Junho of 2PM (broadcasts in two episodes which 2nd half of episode 18 and continue until episode 19)
14th Strong Heart - Oh Jung-hae (Episode 20 and 21)
15th Strong Heart - Kim Na-young (Episode 22)
16th Strong Heart - Kim Jong-kook (Episode 23 and 24)
17th Strong Heart - Ha Chun-hwa (Episode 25 and 26)
18th Strong Heart - Rain (Episode 27 and 28)
19th Strong Heart - Bae Seul-ki (Episode 29 and 30)
20th Strong Heart - Yoo Sang-chul (Episode 31 and 32)
21st Strong Heart - Shindong of Super Junior (Episode 33 and 34)
22nd Strong Heart - Seungri of Big Bang (Episode 35 and 36)
23rd Strong Heart - No Min-woo (Episode 37 and 38)
24th Strong Heart - Park Jung-ah (Episode 39 and 40)
25th Strong Heart - Se7en (Episode 41 and 42)
26th Strong Heart - Ryu Si-won (Episode 43 and 44)
27th Strong Heart - Choi Hong-man (Episode 45 and 46)
28th Strong Heart - Oh Jong-hyuk (Episode 47 and 48)
29th Strong Heart - Yoon Son-ha (Episode 49 and 50)
30th Strong Heart - Huh Gak (Episode 51 and 52)
31st Strong Heart - Sooyoung of Girls' Generation (Episode 53 and 54)
32nd Strong Heart - Lee Moo Song (Episode 55 and 56)
33rd Strong Heart - Ahn Mun-sook (Episode 57 and 58)
34th Strong Heart -  (Episode 59 and 60)
35th Strong Heart - Jo Kwon of 2AM (Episode 61 and 62)
36th Strong Heart - Yunho of TVXQ (Episode 63 and 64)
37th Strong Heart - Kim Ja-ok (Episode 65 and 66)
38th Strong Heart - Kang Soo-ji (Episode 67 and 68)
39th Strong Heart - Dokgo Young-jae (Episode 69 and 70)
40th Strong Heart - Tae Jin-ah (Episode 71 and 72)
44th Strong Heart - Oh Jung-hae (episode 81, 82 and 83)
49th Strong Heart - Kyuhyun of Super Junior (Episode 92 and 93)
50th Strong Heart - Yoo Hyun-sang (Episode 94 and 95)
51st Strong Heart - Lee Ye-rin, last episode with MC Kang Ho-dong (Episode 96 and 97)
52nd Strong Heart - Vicky of Diva (Episode 98 and 99)
54th Strong Heart - Kim Ji-sook (Episode 101 and 102)
55th Strong Heart - Seo Kyung-seok (Episode 103 and 104)
56th Strong Heart - Lee Bon (Episode 105 and 106)
63rd Strong Heart - Park Eun-hye (Episode 119 and 120)
64th Strong Heart - Kim Ae-kyung (Episode 121 and 122)
65th Strong Heart - Se7en, YG family special and last episode with Lee Seung-gi (Episode 123 and 124)
66th Strong Heart - Lee Jin-wook, first episode with host Shin Dong-yup and Lee Dong-wook (Episode 125 and 126)
67th Strong Heart - Ivy (Episode 127 and 128)
68th Strong Heart - Baek A-yeon (Episode 129 and 130)
69th Strong Heart - Choi Yoon-young (Episode 131 and 132)
70th Strong Heart - Cultwo (Jung Chan-woo and Kim Tae-gyun) (Episode 133 and 134)
71st Strong Heart - Kim Bu-seon (Episode 135 and 136)
72nd Strong Heart - Bang Eun-hee (Episode 137 and 138)
73rd Strong Heart - Jeon Soo-kyung (Episode 139 and 140)
75th Strong Heart - Hong Seok-cheon (broadcasts in two episodes which 2nd half of episode 142 and continue until episode 143)
76th Strong Heart - Kim Ki-duk (Episode 144 and 145)
77th Strong Heart - Lee Ji-hyun (Episode 146 and 147)
78th Strong Heart - Nancy Lang (Episode 148)
80th Strong Heart - Byul (Episode 150)
81st Strong Heart - Song Chong-gug (Episode 151 and 152)
82nd Strong Heart - Park Gwang-hyun (Episode 155 and 156)
85th Strong Heart - Kim Jung-hwa (Episode 161 and 162)
86th Strong Heart - Kim Chang-ryeol of DJ DOC (Episode 163 and 164)
87th Strong Heart - Sooyoung of Girls' Generation (Episode 165 and 166)

List of episodes and guests

2009

2010

2011

2012

2013

Awards

Same-time Program 

 KBS 《Moonlight Prince》
 KBS 《Kim Seung-woo's SeungSeungJang-gu》
 KBS 《Imagination plus》
 MBC 《PD Note》
 MBC 《100 minutes discussion》

References

External links 
Strong Heart Official Homepage  

Seoul Broadcasting System original programming
South Korean television talk shows
2009 South Korean television series debuts
2013 South Korean television series endings
Korean-language television shows